was an American landscape architect.

Kinoshita was born in Los Angeles, California, then spent his childhood in Japan, returning to the U.S. in 1940. After the Japanese attack on Pearl Harbor, he was first interned in Arkansas, but subsequently served as an interpreter in the United States Army. He received his BA in Architecture from Cornell University in 1955, then received a fellowship to study in Japan, and in 1957 was awarded a Master of Science in Japanese History from Kyoto University. He then worked for the firms of Isoya Yoshida (Tokyo) and Eero Saarinen in Birmingham, Michigan. In 1961, Kinoshita received his Master of Architecture degree in Urban Design from the Harvard University Graduate School of Design, and joined Sasaki, Dawson & DeMay, in Watertown, Massachusetts, where he eventually became a principal. He left Sasaki in 1977 to establish the Urban Design Collaborative International in Columbus, Ohio, and from 1977 to 1990 also served as a professor at Ohio State University and a visiting critic at Harvard, Syracuse, and Yale.

Selected works 
 Waterfall Garden Park, Seattle
 Greenacre Park, New York City
 Constitution Plaza landscaping, fountain, and clock, Hartford
 National Bonsai & Penjing Museum, United States National Arboretum, Washington, DC
 I-Beam, Binghamton, New York

Honors 
 Charles Goodwin Sands Medal
 Robert James Eiditz Fellowship

References 
 Census records, etc, from Ancestry.com
 Internment records
 Invisible Gardens: The Search for Modernism in the American Landscape, Peter Walker, Melanie Louise Simo, MIT Press, 1996, pages 336–337. .
 The Cultural Landscape Foundation: Masao Kinoshita
 Pacific Coast Architects Database entry
 Landscape Voice: Waterfall Garden

American landscape architects
Cornell University College of Architecture, Art, and Planning alumni
Harvard Graduate School of Design alumni
Architects from Los Angeles
Ohio State University faculty